Troy is a town in Greenwood County, South Carolina, United States. The population was 93 at the 2010 census.

History
The Long Cane Massacre Site and Lower Long Cane Associate Reformed Presbyterian Church are listed on the National Register of Historic Places.

Geography
Troy is located in the southwest corner of Greenwood County at  (33.9869, -82.2958). South Carolina Highway 10 passes through the town, leading northeast  to Greenwood, the county seat, and south  to McCormick.

Demographics

As of the census of 2000, there were 105 people, 43 households, and 32 families residing in the town. The population density was 131.4 people per square mile (50.7/km2). There were 51 housing units at an average density of 63.8 per square mile (24.6/km2). The racial makeup of the town was 71.43% White and 28.57% African American.

There were 43 households, out of which 23.3% had children under the age of 18 living with them, 51.2% were married couples living together, 14.0% had a female householder with no husband present, and 23.3% were non-families. 20.9% of all households were made up of individuals, and 16.3% had someone living alone who was 65 years of age or older. The average household size was 2.44 and the average family size was 2.73.

In the town, the population was spread out, with 18.1% under the age of 18, 8.6% from 18 to 24, 23.8% from 25 to 44, 25.7% from 45 to 64, and 23.8% who were 65 years of age or older. The median age was 45 years. For every 100 females, there were 101.9 males. For every 100 females age 18 and over, there were 100.0 males.

The median income for a household in the town was $31,875, and the median income for a family was $35,625. Males had a median income of $26,875 versus $21,250 for females. The per capita income for the town was $15,502. There were no families and 8.2% of the population living below the poverty line, including no under eighteens and 19.2% of those over 64.

References

External Links
The Facebook page for Troy

Towns in Greenwood County, South Carolina
Towns in South Carolina